Al-Kabri was a Palestinian Arab town in the Galilee located  northeast of Acre. It was captured by the Haganah 21 May 1948, a week after the State of Israel was declared. In 1945, it had a population of 1,520 and a total area cultivated of 20,617 dunams. It is near the site of Tel Kabri.

History

Crusader era
In the 13th century, al-Kabri was known as "Le Quiebre" and belonged to the fief of Casal Imbert (az-Zeeb). In 1253, King Henry granted the whole estate of Casal Imbert, including Le Quiebre, to John of Ibelin. Shortly after, in 1256, John of Ibelin leased az-Zeeb and all its dependent villages, including Le Quiebre, to the Teutonic Order for ten years. In 1261, az-Zeeb, together with Le Fierge and Le Quiebre, were sold to the Teutonic Order, in return for an annual sum for as long as Acre was in Crusader hands. In 1283, it was still a part of the Crusader states, as it was mentioned under the name "al-Kabrah", as part of their domain in the hudna (truce agreement) between the Crusaders based in Acre and the Mamluk sultan al-Mansur Qalawun.

Mamluk period
According to al-Maqrizi, it was under Mamluk rule by 1291, as it was mentioned under the name of "al-Kabira" in that year when Sultan al-Ashraf Khalil allocated the town's income to a charitable organization in Cairo.

Ottoman era

Al-Kabri was incorporated into the Ottoman Empire in 1517, and by the 1596 tax records it was part of nahiya (subdistrict) of Akka, part of Safad Sanjak with an all-Muslim population of ten households.  The villagers paid a fixed tax rate of 25%  on various agricultural products, including wheat, barley, summer crops, cotton, beehives and/or goats and occasional revenues; a total of 1,691 akçe. 7/12 of the revenue went to a Waqf.

In Pierre Jacotin's map from 1799 the village was called Kabli. The place was well known for its springs, including Ayn Mafshuh, Ayn Fawwar, Ayn al-'Asal, and Ayn Kabri. The number of springs made al-Kabri the main supplier of water in the District of Acre. Ancient aqueducts supplied water from the springs to Acre, and two additional canals were built by Ahmad Pasha al-Jazzar in 1800, and Sulayman Pasha al-Adil in 1814.

In 1875, the French explorer Victor Guérin visited the village:

Many of the houses are built of good materials, which seem ancient. They are constructed of stones finely cut, mixed with simple rubble, perfectly jointed by means of little stones so placed as to fill up spaces and to make the whole compact. The site of an ancient church, now completely destroyed, is still, to a certain extent, to be traced. Many columns have been removed from it, and numbers of cut stones of medium size. Above the village, the ruins of houses prove that the place was once much more populous than now.

At twenty-five minutes walk from El Kabry is a spring called Neba Fawara. Formerly received in a basin, of which the foundations only are now visible, it runs away in a considerable stream, which waters several gardens.	Enormous fig-trees show the extraordinary fruitfulness of the soil. A little farther I pass along arcades entirely covered with high bushes, which form part of the aqueduct of El Kabry. The ground rises here, so that the canal supported by these arcades is at the level of the ground, then it disappears altogether, reappearing again, according to the level of the ground. El Kabry is in a very advantageous position, thanks to its precious springs, which must always have caused the foundation of a group, more or less considerable, of houses. The name of Kabry shows that it was once called Gobara, a name given by Josephus to a place in another part of Galilee. It contains two abundant springs; one is received in a reservoir similar to that of Et Tell, and from there, by an opening made expressly, the water runs off in a cascade to turn mills and water gardens. The second spring gushes from the bottom of a kind of vaulted cave, into which one descends by steps, and it feeds the aqueduct, which, sometimes subterranean, sometimes on the level of the ground, sometimes borne in arcades, supplies Akka with water. Reconstructed by Jezzar Pasha at the end of the last century, this aqueduct has succeeded one much older, of which traces yet remain.

Besides these two springs there is a third not far off, called Ain Jatun, of equal importance, which fertilises the proverbially fruitful territory of Kabry.

In 1881 the PEF's Survey of Western Palestine described the village as a "village built of stone, containing about 400 Moslems, situated on the edge of the plain, with gardens and olives, figs and mulberries, apples and pomegranates; there is a large spring and birket here, at which the aqueduct conveying water to 'Akka commences."

A population list from about 1887 showed el Kabry to have about 690 inhabitants, all Muslims.

British Mandate period
In the 1922 census of Palestine conducted by the British Mandate authorities, al-Kabri had a population of 553 inhabitants, all Muslims, increasing in the 1931 census to 728 Muslims in 173 houses. During this period, al-Kabri's houses were built of stone, mud, and reinforced concrete. The village contained a mosque and a boys' elementary school. Agriculture was the base of the economy with villagers cultivating olives, citrus, and bananas and engaged in animal husbandry, including raising cattle.

The population grew to 1,530 in the 1945 statistics, still all Muslim. Together with the nearby Tarshiha, the villages had 47,428 dunums of land at this time. Of this, a total of 743 dunums of land in the two villages was used for citrus and bananas, 5,301 were plantation and irrigable land, 14,123 for cereals, while 252 dunams were built-up (urban) land.

1947-8 civil war

Al-Kabri was first badly shaken by the Palmach raid on the village on the night 31 January/1 February 1948, in which the house of the main al-Husayni-affiliated notable, Fares Efendi Sirhan, was partly demolished by a huge explosion. After this, Sirhan and his family fled to Lebanon. On 27 March 1948, the Yehiam convoy bringing supplies to besieged Kibbutz Yehiam was ambushed while passing by al-Kabri and 46 Haganah members were killed.

In April 1948, the Haganah prepared an initial blueprint for an operation called "Ehud", which provided for attacks on al-Kabri, al Nahar, al-Bassa and al-Zib for "the destruction of the gangs [and] the menfolk, [and] the destruction of property". Yaacov Pundaq, a Haganah commander in the Carmeli Brigade's 21st Battalion, who was responsible for the area around Nahariya  designated to be part of the future Arab state in the 1947 United Nations Partition Plan, had repeatedly caused damage to the Kabri aqueduct nearby, the primary conduit for feeding Acre. In the face of successful repair work by Arabs, he contaminated the site's waters with flasks of typhoid, or typhoid and diphtheria bacteria. This was the most serious use of Israel's deployment of biological warfare in 1948.

Israeli period
The village was likely occupied on the night of 20–21 May during the second stage of Operation Ben-Ami, by which time most of the inhabitants had fled. During their dispersal in Galilee some of the villagers were killed when it was discovered that they came from al-Kabri, in retaliation for the convoy ambush.

According to Palestinian historian Walid Khalidi, the remaining structures in al-Kabri's lands in 1992 were "crumbled walls and stone rubble, overgrown with thorns, weeds, and bushes." A Jewish community by the same name, Kabri, was built on land adjacent to the site of the Palestinian village, which is also for agriculture and pasture land.

References

Bibliography

  
 

  (p. 56)
   (possibly Kabartha p. 154 )
  ( p. 634)
  
 
    

 
  

Nazzal, Nafez (1974): The Zionist occupation of western Galilee, 1948, Journal of Palestine Studies, Vol. 3, No. 3, 58–76.

External links
Welcome to al-Kabri Palestine Remembered.
al-Kabri, Zochrot
Survey of Western Palestine, Map 3:  IAA, Wikimedia commons 
Al-Kabri at Khalil Sakakini Cultural Center
Al-Kabri photos, from Dr. Moslih Kanaaneh

District of Acre
Arab villages depopulated during the 1948 Arab–Israeli War
Teutonic Order